Pattiya Juangjan (born January 16, 1998) (formerly name Kanittha Juangjan) is a Thai indoor volleyball player. She is a current member of the Thailand women's national volleyball team.

Clubs 
  Sisaket (2014–2015)
  Thai-Denmark Nongrua (2015–2016)
  Rangsit (2017–2018)
  Supreme Chonburi E-Tech (2018–2021)
  Khonkaen (2021–2022)

Awards

Club
 2018–19 Thailand League -  Runner-Up, with Supreme Chonburi
 2019 Thai–Denmark Super League -  Champion, with Supreme Chonburi

National team

U20 team 
 2016 Asian Championship -  Bronze Medal

U18 team 
 2014 Asian Championship -  Silver Medal

References

External links
 FIVB Biography

1998 births
Living people
Pattiya Juangjan
Pattiya Juangjan
Pattiya Juangjan
Pattiya Juangjan